Ronald Sheed (1947 – June 2018) was a Scottish footballer who played in midfield for Kilmarnock and Partick Thistle F.C.

Sheed made his Kilmarnock debut in a Fairs Cup tie against Romanian outfit Dinamo Bacau and went on to make 152 appearances for the Rugby Park club. Sheed then moved to Partick Thistle in 1977 making a handful of appearances before retiring from the senior game in 1980.

Sheed died in June 2018 at the age of 71.

References 

1947 births
2018 deaths
Kilmarnock F.C. players
Partick Thistle F.C. players
Association football midfielders
Scottish footballers